Myakuhaku (脈拍) is the thirteenth studio album by the Japanese rock band MUCC, released on January 25, 2017 in Japan by Sony Japan and February 10, 2017 in Europe by Gan-Shin. It was produced by Ken from L'Arc-en-Ciel and Miya.

The album's singles are "Yueni, Matenrou", "Heide" and the opening theme of The Seven Deadly Sins: Signs of Holy War, "Classic". 

Myakuhaku peaked at the seventeenth position at Oricon Albums Chart.

Release 
Myakuhaku was released on January 25, 2017 in Japan, in three editions: limited A, limited B and regular. The limited editions contain a documentary about the album, the band's 20 years and a live DVD of the show MITO GROOVIN'2016. In addition, edition A contains a 60-page bonus booklet and has been limited to 3000 copies. The regular edition contains only the 14-track CD. In Europe, it was released in February 10, 2017 by Gan-Shin.

Track listing

Personnel 
 Tatsurou - vocals
 Miya - guitar
 Yukke - bass guitar
 Satochi  - drums
 Ken - producer

Covers 
"Classic", "EMP", and "Heide" were covered by Flow, Ken, and Roach respectively, on the 2017 Mucc tribute album Tribute Of Mucc -en-.

Charts

References

Japanese-language albums
2017 albums
Mucc albums